Danila Sergeyevich Kozlov (born 19 January 2005) is a Russian football player. He plays as an attacking midfielder for Zenit St. Petersburg.

Club career
He made his debut for Zenit St. Petersburg on 25 February 2023 in a Russian Cup game against Volga Ulyanovsk.

Career statistics

References

External links
 
 

2005 births
Living people
Russian footballers
Russia youth international footballers
Association football midfielders
FC Zenit Saint Petersburg players